"Big Love" is a song written by David Bellamy, and recorded by American country music duo The Bellamy Brothers.  It was released in January 1989 as the second single from the album Rebels Without a Clue.  The song reached number 5 on the Billboard Hot Country Singles & Tracks chart.

Chart performance

References

1989 singles
The Bellamy Brothers songs
Song recordings produced by Jimmy Bowen
Song recordings produced by James Stroud
MCA Records singles
Curb Records singles
Songs written by David Bellamy (singer)
1989 songs